The Canadian Wargamers Journal was a quarterly wargaming magazine. Published by the Canadian Wargamers Group from 1985 to 1996, for a total of 47 issues, its content primarily covered board wargaming with some articles about miniature wargaming.

Canadian Wargamers Group
The magazine was published by the Canadian Wargamers Group of Calgary, Alberta. Keith Martens was the founder and editor and was joined by Bruce McFarlane (head contributor and writer) and Ken Hole (managing editor.) They have also produced many wargaming miniatures rules sets. Fallcon, Calgary's largest gaming convention, got its start thanks to CWG.

Reception
It was the winner of four Charles S. Roberts Awards for "Best Amateur Wargaming Magazine" (from 1989 to 1992).

References

External links
 Canadian Wargamers Group website
 Charles S. Roberts Awards

1985 establishments in Alberta
Defunct magazines published in Canada
Magazines disestablished in 1996
Magazines established in 1985
Magazines published in Alberta
Mass media in Calgary
Origins Award winners
Wargaming magazines
Hobby magazines published in Canada